Marco Martinelli (born 9 October 1965 in Rovereto, Trentino) is a former Italian volleyball player, who later became a volleyball coach. He earned a total number of 155 caps for the Men's National Team, and made his debut on 22 May 1987 in Montichiari against Poland.

References
 Profile

1965 births
Living people
People from Rovereto
Italian men's volleyball players
Italian volleyball coaches
Sportspeople from Trentino